The Molina Rocks are a small group of rocks  west of the Tupinier Islands, Trinity Peninsula, Antarctica. The name appears on a Chilean government chart of 1951.

References

External links

Rock formations of the Trinity Peninsula